The Winds of War is a 1983 miniseries, directed and produced by Dan Curtis, that follows the 1971 book of the same name written by Herman Wouk. Just as in the book, in addition to the lives of the Henry and Jastrow families, much time in the miniseries is devoted to the major global events of the early years of World War II. Adolf Hitler and the German General Staff, with the fictitious general Armin von Roon as a major character, is a prominent subplot of the miniseries. The Winds of War also includes segments of documentary footage, narrated by William Woodson, to explain major events and important characters.

It was followed by a sequel, War and Remembrance, in 1988, also based on a novel written by Wouk and also directed and produced by Curtis.

With 140 million viewers of part or all of Winds of War, it was the most-watched miniseries at that time.

Plot
The film follows the plot of Wouk's novel closely, depicting events from March 1939 until the entry of the United States into World War II in December 1941. It tells the story of Victor "Pug" Henry, and his family, and their relationships with a mixture of real people and fictional characters. Henry is a Naval Officer and friend of President Franklin D. Roosevelt.

Main cast

 Robert Mitchum as Victor Henry ("Pug")
 Ali MacGraw as Natalie Jastrow
 Jan-Michael Vincent as Byron Henry ("Briny")
 John Houseman as Aaron Jastrow
 Polly Bergen as Rhoda Henry
 Lisa Eilbacher as Madeline Henry
 David Dukes as Leslie Slote
 Topol as Berel Jastrow
 Ben Murphy as Warren Henry
 Deborah Winters as Janice Lacouture Henry
 Peter Graves as Palmer Kirby ("Fred")
 Jeremy Kemp as Brig. Gen. Armin von Roon
 Ralph Bellamy as President Franklin Delano Roosevelt
 Victoria Tennant as Pamela Tudsbury
 Günter Meisner as Adolf Hitler
 Howard Lang as Winston Churchill
 Michael Logan as Alistair Tudsbury
 Barry Morse as Wolf Stoller
 Wolfgang Preiss as Field Marshal Walter von Brauchitsch
 Reinhard Kolldehoff as Hermann Göring
 Anton Diffring as Joachim von Ribbentrop
 Werner Kreindl as Col Gen Franz Halder
 Enzo G. Castellari as Benito Mussolini
 Sky Du Mont as Count Ciano
 Edmund Purdom as Luigi Gianelli
 Lawrence Pressman as Bunky Thurston
 Scott Brady as Captain Red Tully
 Leo Gordon as General 'Train' Anderson
 John Dehner as Admiral Ernest King
 Andrew Duggan as Admiral Husband Kimmel
 Charles Lane as Admiral William Standley
 Logan Ramsey as Congressman Lacouture
 Patrick Allen as Air Marshal Dowding
 Allan Cuthbertson as Major General Tillet
 Ferdy Mayne as Ludwig Rosenthal
 Barbara Steele as Frau Stoller
 William Berger as Phil Briggs
 Joseph Hacker as Lt Carter 'Lady' Astor
 Ben Piazza as Aloysius Whitman
 Peter Brocco as Natalie's Father
 Brian Blessed as General Yevlenko (uncredited)

Production

Development
Author Herman Wouk was exceedingly pessimistic about a film adaptation of his beloved and scrupulously researched novel, because he had been extremely unhappy with earlier film adaptations of his novels Marjorie Morningstar, The Caine Mutiny and Youngblood Hawke. He was convinced by Paramount Pictures and the ABC television network that a miniseries would allow the full breadth of his epic story to be brought to life onscreen. Wouk required unusual control over the production in his contract, including considerable influence on the production and veto power over what products could be advertised during the miniseries and how many, commercials would be allowed. Wouk also has a cameo as the archbishop of Siena.

I, Claudius screenwriter Jack Pulman was originally hired to adapt the novel. He and Wouk worked for months preparing an outline. After Pulman died suddenly in 1979, Wouk himself wrote the teleplay for the series.

Casting
The casting of Lee Strasberg as Aaron Jastrow was publicly announced in February 1981. Strasberg had to withdraw from the production before filming any scenes, due to ill health (he died in 1982). He was replaced by John Houseman. Houseman later had to withdraw from the sequel miniseries, War and Remembrance, due to his own ill health (he died in 1988). Houseman was replaced by John Gielgud.

Filming
Paramount produced the miniseries for $40 million ($ in  dollars). ABC paid $32 million for the broadcast rights, then charged advertisers $175,000 for 30-second commercials and $350,000 for one-minute commercials. ABC expected simply to break even on the original broadcast and make any profits from later reruns and syndication.
 The 962-page script contained 1,785 scenes and 285 speaking parts. 
 The production involved 4,000 camera setups and shot a million feet of exposed film.
 The production had a 206-day shooting schedule and came in four days ahead of schedule.
 The series was shot at 404 locations in Europe, California and Washington state over 14 months. 
 Principal locations were Zagreb, Opatija and Rijeka in Yugoslavia; Berchtesgaden and Munich in West Germany; Siena, Florence, Milan and Rome, Italy; London, UK; Vienna, Austria; Naval Station Bremerton in Bremerton, Washington and throughout the Los Angeles area and Southern California.
 The opening scene sub-titled "Berlin" was actually filmed in and around the Hofburg in Vienna.
 The production made use of battle scenes from other films during the attack scene on Pearl Harbor and during the German attacks on the Soviet Union, including scenes for both battles from Tora! Tora! Tora!
 The OpsRoom at RAF Uxbridge, from which the Battle of Britain fighter defenses were commanded, is only rarely made available to the public. Producer Dan Curtis managed to get permission to film there.
 Nazi concentration camp-survivor Branko Lustig was an associate producer in the miniseries and also on Schindler's List.

Post-production
 The music was composed by Robert "Bob" Cobert, a composer often associated with Curtis.

Episodes
The miniseries was shown by ABC in seven parts over seven evenings, between February 6 and February 13, 1983. It had a runtime of 18 hours including commercials, or 14 hours 40 minutes excluding commercials. Parts One, Two, Six and Seven ran for three hours including commercials, while parts Three, Four and Five ran for two hours including commercials. It attracted an average of 80 million viewers per night.

Reception
A premiere screening of the first episode was held in Washington D.C. at the Kennedy Center on Thursday, February 3, 1983, three nights before airing on ABC. The screening was attended by members of the cast including Robert Mitchum, Ali MacGraw, John Houseman, Polly Bergen and Peter Graves. Producer/director Dan Curtis and writer and Washington resident Herman Wouk also attended, though Wouk refused all requests for interviews, saying "I'm a very private person." Also attending were Paramount owner Charles Bluhdorn, who hosted the event, as well as ABC Motion Pictures President Brandon Stoddard, Jack Valenti, Ted Kennedy, Robert McNamara, Art Buchwald, two senators, and numerous other Washington luminaries.

After running a massive year-long advertising campaign, which cost an additional $23 million, ABC reported that the miniseries had 140 million viewers for all or part of its eighteen hours, making it the most-watched miniseries up to that time.

New York Times TV critic John O'Connor said that the "hoopla on The Winds of War' has been nearly as massive as the project itself. The result, while not as artistically impressive as 'Brideshead Revisited,' is less manipulative than 'Holocaust' and at least as emotionally compelling as 'Roots.'" Mitchum, he said, "manages to carry the art of acting to the extremes of minimalism. He moves like an imposing battleship." Most of the actors, he said, are "at least 10 years older than the characters they are playing." Overall, O'Connor said, "the story does hold. It rumbles along, creating its own momentum, until it eventually becomes the television equivalent of a good read that can't be put down."

Columnist Tom Shales of The Washington Post called the miniseries "bulbous and bloated" and said "a first-year film-school student could edit three or four hours out of the thing without hurting the flow at all." Watching Winds of War,'' he said, "ecstatic superlatives like 'competent' and 'acceptable' come to mind." He ridiculed the performances, and described the actors as too old for their roles.

The show was a success throughout the United States and received many accolades, including Golden Globe nominations and various Emmy wins and nominations.

Emmy AwardsWon: Outstanding Cinematography for a Limited Series or a Special
 Outstanding Individual Achievement - Costumers
 Outstanding Individual Achievement - Special Visual EffectsNominated:'''
 Outstanding Art Direction for a Limited Series or a Special
 Outstanding Directing in a Limited Series or a Special
 Outstanding Film Editing for a Limited Series or a Special
 Outstanding Film Sound Editing for a Limited Series or a Special
 Outstanding Film Sound Mixing for a Limited Series or a Special (three individual episodes nominated)
 Outstanding Limited Series (Dan Curtis, producer)
 Outstanding Supporting Actor in a Limited Series or a Special (Ralph Bellamy, for playing Franklin Delano Roosevelt)
 Outstanding Supporting Actress in a Limited Series or a Special (Polly Bergen, for playing Rhoda Henry)

References

External links

 
 
 The Winds of War opening titles on YouTube

Cultural depictions of Adolf Hitler
American Broadcasting Company original programming
1980s American television miniseries
Cultural depictions of Winston Churchill
English-language television shows
Films directed by Dan Curtis
Films set in the 1930s
Television shows based on American novels
Television series by CBS Studios
Holocaust films
World War II television series
World War II television drama series
American World War II films
Films shot in Croatia
Films shot in Yugoslavia
Films based on works by Herman Wouk
Works about women in war
Television series set in 1940
Television series set in 1941